Rathi Polybond is an engineering and rubber group based in India. It specialises in the manufacture and distribution of couplings, rubber products, anti-vibration mounts and other similar products. The group has two main companies; Rathi Transpower which is responsible for power transmission devices and Rathi Polybond which creates the rubber products. The group distributes to over 40 countries worldwide.

Rathi Transpower 

Originally known as Rathi Engineering Works, Rathi Transpower dates back to 1941, where the Rathi Family established a textile mill in Pune, India. After several years, it expanded into engineering products and quickly focused on manufacturing and exporting in this area. In 1993 the company was certified ISO 9001. In 1995 the company relocated from Pune to Alandi, India.

Created in 1978 under the name, Rathi Rubber Products, Rathi Polybond was established in order to cater to captive consumption of rubber elements used in the manufacture of couplings. The company was certified ISO 9001 in 1998 and relocated to Alandi with Rathi Transpower.

References

External links
 Official Rathi Transpower website.
 Official Rathi Polybond website.

Engineering companies of India
Companies based in Pune
Manufacturing companies established in 1941
Indian companies established in 1941